Owen Watkin (born 12 October 1996) is a Wales international rugby union player who plays for Ospreys regional team as a centre.

Club career
A product of the Ospreys Academy, he signed his first professional contract with his home region in 2016 having also featured for his hometown team, Bridgend Ravens.

Having made his regional debut for the Ospreys in September, 2015 as an 18-year-old, he has developed into a mainstay at the Liberty Stadium. After his breakthrough season in 2015/16 he suffered an anterior cruciate knee ligament injury in training in July, 2016, and was forced to spend more than a year on the sidelines.

International career
After presenting great progress for his regional team, Watkin was selected in the 36 man squad for the Autumn internationals in 2017. He made his international test debut against Australia on the 11th of November 2017, replacing Owen Williams in the 68th minute. He was recognised by Warren Gatland as an upcoming star and was selected for multiple other squads, including the Grand Slam winning Welsh team in 2019. During the 2019 Six Nations Championship, Watkin scored a try against Italy after a cross-field kick from Gareth Anscombe. Wales' win against Italy was their 11th win in a row, beating their previous record.

Owen Watkin was selected in the 46 man training squad to travel to Switzerland in June 2019 ahead of the 2019 Rugby World Cup.

International tries

External links 
Ospreys Player Profile
WRU Player Profile

1996 births
Bryncethin RFC players
Living people
Ospreys (rugby union) players
Rugby union players from Bridgend
Wales international rugby union players
Welsh rugby union players
Rugby union centres